San Michele Arcangelo, also known as Sant'Angelo, is a paleo-Christian temple in the city of Perugia in Umbria. The circular building dates to the 5th to 6th century, and incorporates corinthian capped columns from a prior pagan temple. It is dedicated to the Archangel Michael, whose churches were often located in elevated spots. The small round church is also often called Tempio or Tempietto, and is located in the neighborhood Borgo Sant'Angelo, near the ancient northern gate (Porta Sant'Angelo) of the city. 

The structure of the church has been altered across the centuries; in 1479, it was converted into a small fort. A major restoration occurred in 1948 that revealed ancient frescoes and sealed windows. The architecture is an early Romanesque with Byzantine influences in the chapel placement, but the circular temple is something seen in other ancient churches in central Italy, including the church of Sant'Ercolano and of San Giovanni Rotondo in Perugia. It recalls the church of Santo Stefano Rotondo (460-480) in Rome.

Interior
The interior has a circumferential ambulatory delimited by sixteen columns with corinthian capitals. The interior has some notable early Christian symbolism, including a pentagram at the entrance and some crosses belonging to Knights Templar order.

References

Angelo Perugia
Angelo Perugia
Angelo Perugia
Angelo Perugia
Buildings and structures completed in the 6th century